Thomas Hastings (16 January 1865 – 14 June 1938) was an Australian cricketer. He played 15 first-class cricket matches for Victoria between 1887 and 1909. Hastings was the first player batting at number 11 in to score a century in a first-class match, with 106 not out against South Australia at Melbourne in January 1903.

See also
 List of Victoria first-class cricketers

References

External links
 

1865 births
1938 deaths
Australian cricketers
Victoria cricketers
Cricketers from Melbourne